Markham Ligon Gartley (born May 16, 1944) served as Secretary of State of Maine from 1975 to 1978. He is a veteran of the Vietnam War as a lieutenant in the United States Navy and former prisoner of war. Gartley was born in Louisville, Kentucky to Gerald and Minnie-Lee (née Ligon) Gartley. He earned a Bachelor of Science degree in physics from the Georgia Institute of Technology in 1966.

References

1944 births
Living people
People from Louisville, Kentucky
United States Navy personnel of the Vietnam War
People from Greenville, Maine
Georgia Tech alumni
United States Navy officers
Vietnam War prisoners of war
Secretaries of State of Maine